Philip M. Cohen is the inventor of several chess variants. He authored the column "Olla Podrida" in the periodical Nost-algia published by the (now defunct) correspondence game club NOST. The column regularly featured chess variants, many experimental, since 1972.

Reincarnation Chess
This variant by Cohen uses the same board and pieces as standard chess, but a captured piece can make its presence felt on the board as a zombie, and can "reincarnate" another zombie back into the game by capturing it.

Move rules
When a capture (or series of captures) takes place on a square, a zombie is created when the capturing piece leaves the square. The zombie assumes the same piece type as the (last) piece captured, and the color of the capturing player.

 Zombies cannot capture normal pieces or move through them.
 Normal pieces cannot capture zombies or move through them.
 Zombies can capture or move through other zombies.
 Reincarnation: When a zombie (or series of zombies) is captured on a square, a normal piece is created when the capturing zombie leaves the square. The normal piece assumes the same piece type as the (last) zombie captured, and the color of the capturing player.
 Zombie pawns promote to zombie pieces and retain their piece type if reincarnated.
 Pieces reborn on their starting squares regain their usual privileges (the pawn's initial two-square advance; the rook's eligibility to castle).

There is no en passant capture in Reincarnation Chess.

Variants invented

 Null Chess (1960s)
 Zombie Chess (1964), a variant is Dying Zombie Chess 
 Reincarnation Chess (1960s), a development of Zombie Chess
 Ricochet Chess (1968)
 Free Megarotation Chess (presumed 1969)
 Free Rotation Chess (1969), a variant of Actuated Revolving Centre (ARC) Chess by A. E. Farebrother and W. H. Rawlings (1937) 
 Restricted Rotation Chess (presumed 1969)
 Rotation Chess or Gumption Chess (1969) 
 Slippery Centre Chess (c. 1970)
 Crossings Chess (1973), an adaptation to chess of Robert Abbott's game Crossings
 Heterocoalescence Chess (1973), a variant of Coordinate Chess (Co-Chess) based on an idea by Ralph Betza
 Nemesis Chess (1973)
 Surge Chess (1973), a variant of Crossings Chess
 Parton Chess (1974), in honor of V. R. Parton
 Merger Chess (1975)
 Cohen's Error Chess (1977)
 Tutti-Frutti Chess (1978), with Ralph Betza
 Very Slippery Centre Chess (1978), a variant of Slippery Centre Chess 
 Archimedes Chess (1979), after Scott Marley
 Mixture Chess (1979)
 Ninerider Chess (1979)
 Nuisance Chess (1979), a variant of Coordinate Chess (Co-Chess) by Ralph Betza (1973)
 Blood-Brother Chess (1980), with R. Wayne Schmittberger
 Fast-Track Chess (1986)
 Reciprocal Chess (1990s)
 Ur Chess (1997)

Notes

References

Bibliography

Chess variant inventors
Living people
Year of birth missing (living people)